Christina Øyangen Ørntoft (born 2 July 1985) is a Danish former football defender. She most recently played for Elitedivisionen club Brøndby IF and the Danish national team.

In 2009 Ørntoft suffered an anterior cruciate ligament injury, which ruled her out of UEFA Women's Euro 2009. She re-injured the same knee in 2011.

Swedish Damallsvenskan club LdB FC Malmö signed Ørntoft during their 2008 season, after an injury to regular centre back Malin Levenstad. After playing with Skovlunde and, briefly, Brøndby in her homeland, Ørntoft had already acquired the nickname "Carlos" after Brazilian footballer Roberto Carlos. She would commute to Malmö from Copenhagen, where she had an apartment, boyfriend and was studying at University of Copenhagen. After four years at LdB FC Malmö – disrupted by the injuries – she returned to Brøndby IF in December 2012. In December 2013 she announced a break from football and moved into a youth coaching role with Brøndby due to her pregnancy.

She was named in national coach Kenneth Heiner-Møller's squad for UEFA Women's Euro 2013.

References

External links

Danish Football Union (DBU) statistics

1985 births
Living people
Danish women's footballers
Denmark women's international footballers
Expatriate women's footballers in Sweden
FC Rosengård players
Damallsvenskan players
Brøndby IF (women) players
Women's association football defenders
2007 FIFA Women's World Cup players
Ballerup-Skovlunde Fodbold (women) players

Denmark international footballers
Association football defenders